Kanakono is a town in the far north of Ivory Coast. It is a sub-prefecture and commune of Tengréla Department in Bagoué Region, Savanes District. The border with Mali is five kilometres east of town.

In 2021, the population of the sub-prefecture of Kanakono was 30,630.

Villages
The 6 villages of the sub-prefecture of Kanakono and their population in 2014 are:
 Kanakono (10 127)
 Lomara (4 727)
 Popo (2 248)
 Pourou (2 834)
 Sissengue (2 463)
 Zanikaha (502)

Notes

Sub-prefectures of Bagoué
Communes of Bagoué